Jezersko may refer to:
 Municipality of Jezersko in northern Slovenia
 Seeberg Saddle (Jezerski vrh), a mountain pass connecting Austria and Slovenia
 Jezersko, Kežmarok District, the village and municipality in northern Slovakia